Barren Township is one of twelve townships in Franklin County, Illinois, USA.  As of the 2010 census, its population was 496 and it contained 224 housing units.

Geography

Cities, towns, villages
 Sesser (east edge)

Cemeteries
The township contains Hammond Cemetery.

Major highways
  Illinois Route 154

Lakes
 Rend Lake

Landmarks
 Wayne Fitzgerrell State Recreation Area

Demographics

School districts
 Sesser-Valier Community Unit School District 196

Political districts
 Illinois's 12th congressional district
 State House District 117
 State Senate District 59

References
 
 United States Census Bureau 2007 TIGER/Line Shapefiles
 United States National Atlas

Adjacent townships 

 Elk Prairie Township, Jefferson County (north)
 Spring Garden Township, Jefferson County (northeast)
 Ewing Township (east)
 Benton Township (southeast)
 Browning Township (south)
 Tyrone Township (southwest)
 Goode Township (west)
 Bald Hill Township, Jefferson County (northwest)

External links
 City-Data.com
 Illinois State Archives

Townships in Franklin County, Illinois
Townships in Illinois